New Moon (stylized as new moon) is a 2006 romantic fantasy novel by author Stephenie Meyer. The second installment in the Twilight series, the novel continues the story of Bella Swan's relationship with vampire Edward Cullen as she enters her senior year of high school. When Edward leaves Bella after his brother attacks her, she is left heartbroken and depressed for months until Jacob Black becomes her best friend. However, her life twists once more when Jacob's nature reveals itself and Edward's sister decides to visit.

According to Meyer, the book is about losing true love. The title refers to the darkest phase of the lunar cycle, indicating that New Moon is about the darkest time of protagonist Bella Swan's life. Meyer wrote the book before Twilight was published. Writing the book was difficult for Meyer as she feared the readers' reaction to the book and often cried as she described Bella's pain.

The book was originally released in hardcover on September 6, 2006 with an initial print run of 100,000 copies. Upon its publication in the United States, New Moon was highly successful and moved quickly to the top of bestseller lists, becoming one of the most anticipated books of the year. It peaked at #1 on both the New York Times Best Seller list and USA Today's Top 150 Bestsellers, and was the biggest selling children's paperback of 2008 with over 5.3 million copies sold. Moreover, New Moon was the best-selling book of 2009 and has been translated into 38 languages. A film adaptation of the book was released on November 20, 2009.

Reception for New Moon was more positive than that for its predecessor. Some criticized the middle section's pacing; critics generally, however, argued the novel was more mature in tone, praising the character development and its depiction of human emotion.

Plot
On Bella Swan's eighteenth birthday, Edward Cullen, the vampire she loves, and his family host her a birthday party at their residence. While unwrapping a gift, Bella receives a paper cut. Edward's adopted brother, Jasper, is overwhelmed by the scent of her blood and attempts to attack her. Trying to protect her, Edward and the Cullens move away from Forks, but in an attempt to encourage Bella to move on, Edward tells her it is because he no longer loves her. With Edward's departure, Bella suffers severe memory loss and depression for several months.

In the months that follow, Bella learns that thrill-seeking activities, such as motorcycle riding and cliff-diving, allow her to "hear" Edward's voice in her head through her subconscious mind. She also seeks comfort in her deepening friendship with Jacob Black, a cheerful companion who eases her pain over losing Edward. Sometime after losing Edward, Bella starts to enjoy Jacob's company and friendship. After spending some time with Bella, Jacob starts experiencing some unexpected and drastic changes in his mood swings, body, and personality. As Jacob undergoes a very long, painful, and life-altering transformation, Bella and Charlie become concerned. A few weeks later, Bella notes that Jacob isn't as happy-go-lucky as he once was. She isn't so comfortable with Jacob's recent changes, and shortly thereafter, she discovers that Jacob has unwillingly become a werewolf and that there are other tribe members who are werewolves too. Jacob and his pack protect Bella from the vampire, Laurent, who was a part of James' coven, and also Victoria, who seeks revenge for her dead mate, James, whom the Cullens had killed in the previous installment. Jacob starts developing physical emotions towards Bella, but she doesn't feel the same after experiencing a life-changing breakup with Edward. This makes him horribly sad and envious of Edward. Jacob then saves Bella from drowning after jumping off a cliff and almost kisses her in the events following.

Meanwhile, a series of miscommunications leads Edward to believe that Bella has committed suicide by jumping off a cliff. Distraught over her suspected suicide, Edward flees to Volterra, Italy to provoke the Volturi, vampire royalty who are capable of killing him, though they refuse, deeming his mind-reading ability to be too valuable. In contrast to Edward's rash reaction to the news of Bella's death, Alice Cullen cleverly makes a surprise visit to Bella's house, which overwhelms Bella. Bella asks a series of questions, and Alice tells her that she saw Bella trying to kill herself. As Alice's visions about Edward change rapidly, Alice and Bella are unable to clearly understand whether Edward is or will be safe. They rush to Italy to prevent Edward from revealing himself to humans so the Volturi are forced to kill him, arriving just in time to stop him. Before leaving Italy, the Volturi tell Edward that Bella, a human who knows that vampires exist, must either be killed or transformed into a vampire to protect the secret. When they return to Forks, Edward tells Bella that he has always loved her and only left Forks to protect her. She forgives him, and the Cullens vote in favor of Bella being transformed into a vampire, to Rosalie and Edward's dismay. However, Jacob sternly reminds Edward about an important part of their treaty: if the Cullens bite a human for any reason, the treaty is over and the wolves will attack. When Bella reminds him that it's none of his concern as being a vampire is what she wants, Jacob reveals it is his business as she doesn't understand what's going to be at stake for her and the Cullens. Before he can continue warning her, they hear an angry Charlie asking Bella to get inside the house at once. Jacob apologizes to Bella once more before leaving, and the story concludes with Charlie grounding Bella for running off to Italy.

Differences between film and novel
Bella never confronted Sam in his werewolf form in the novel, but rather in his human form, which Emily later explains everything to her. The film, has her confronting him in his wolf form.
Unlike in the film where Charlie grounds Bella after she runs off to Italy, Charlie grounds her after he sees her with Edward at their house in the novel's conclusion.
In the novel's end, Edward never proposed to Bella, but rather walked her in the house to explain everything to Charlie. The film omits this.
In the novel, Edward doesn't try to stop Jane when she attempted to her abilities on Bella and failed. In the film, he does and gets hurt mentally.

Development
After Meyer finished writing Twilight, she found herself writing multiple, hundred-page epilogues, and has said, "I quickly realized I wasn't ready to stop writing about Bella and Edward." She began writing a sequel, which was entitled Forever Dawn and skipped over Bella's final year of high school. While Meyer was still writing Forever Dawn, she learned that Twilight was going to be published and marketed as a young-adult novel. Wanting the next book to be aimed at a similar audience, she decided to write a new sequel, New Moon, which took place during Bella's senior year of high school. Therefore, Meyer started writing the outline of the book and thinking of what her characters would do, and claims that she "swiftly regretted asking them for the story." She didn't like the idea of Edward leaving at first and tried to think of other plot options, but, in the end, she said that "she accepted the inevitability of it."

Meyer wrote New Moon in five months. She found the editing process "much longer and more difficult than the same process with Twilight." Also, unlike Twilight, which Meyer intended not to publish at first, she recognized that New Moon was going to be published and had what she described as a "horrible feeling much like stage fright" while writing. However, Meyer considers Jacob to be her favorite gift the book gave, as she liked the character a lot and wanted to expand his role and presence.

The confrontation with the Volturi in the clock tower at the end of the book was the first scene Meyer wrote. She did not want to use a real city as the location for the Volturi's residence, as she did with Forks. She decided to name her city "Volturin" and chose a location in Tuscany, Italy because it matched her vision of the city being "very old and relatively remote." However, when consulting a map, she found that there was a city called Volterra in the area where she had planned to place her imaginary city. Therefore, she chose Volterra and called it "a pretty creepy coincidence."

The first draft of New Moon differed significantly from the manuscript published. Originally, Bella never found out that Jacob was a werewolf, and as a result, the seventy pages following Bella's discovery of Jacob's nature were missing. The epilogue was also different in title and content. Meyer found it difficult to write Bella's pain over Edward's departure and often cried while writing those parts. She mentioned that she never suffered a heartbreak like Bella's, so she couldn't draw inspiration for her pain from personal experiences, but based it on how she thought she would feel if she lost a child, while insisting that it came from her character, who is "much more open—to both pain and joy." She claims that "the way she chose to cope with it" was unexpected.

According to Meyer, the story was inspired by Shakespeare's Romeo and Juliet.

Cover and title
The cover art of New Moon was designed by Gail Doobinin and photographed by John Grant. Meyer has expressed on numerous occasions that she had no hand in choosing the cover, and said that she does not like it. She described it as "a very lovely ruffled tulip that means nothing at all". Originally, Meyer suggested a clock image for the cover as she saw "time" as one of the most important themes of the novel. However, the artwork team that designed the cover chose the image of a tulip losing one of its petals, aiming to represent Bella losing a drop of blood.

When Meyer finished writing the book, she wanted a title that referred to a time of day to match Twilight. As it reflected the mood of the sequel, she titled the novel New Moon, "the darkest kind of night, a night with no moon", to refer to the darkest period of Bella's life.

Publication and reception

Sales
New Moon was published by Little, Brown in the USA on September 6, 2006 with an initial print run of 100,000 copies. Demand for the book was so high that advance reading copies were being sold on eBay for as high as $380. New Moon immediately rose to the #1 position on the New York Times Best Seller list for Children's Chapter Books in its second week on the list, displacing popular children's authors such as Christopher Paolini and Markus Zusak, and remained in that spot for eleven weeks. It spent over 47 weeks in total on the list. New Moon also remained on the USA Today Best Seller list for over 150 weeks after entering the list two weeks after its release, later peaking at #1. USA Today ranked it at #29 on its 2007 top-selling books list.

By 2008, Publishers Weekly reported that New Moon had sold 1.5 million copies throughout the U.S. In October 2008, the book was ranked #37 on USA Today's "Bestselling Books of Last 15 Years". According to USA Today, the book was also the second biggest-selling book of 2008 behind its prequel, Twilight, and the biggest-selling of 2009, giving the saga the top four positions on the list for two consecutive years. It was also ranked at #27 on the list of biggest-selling books of 2010.

Critical reception
The novel received mostly positive reviews with some critics feeling that it dragged in the middle. Hillias J. Martin of School Library Journal praised the book, saying, "Less streamlined than Twilight yet just as exciting, New Moon will more than feed the bloodthirsty hankerings of fans of the first volume and leave them breathless for the third". Kirkus Reviews praised the novel, describing it as "an exciting page turner...This tale of tortured demon lovers entices." Moreover, Cindy Dobrez of Booklist gave New Moon a positive review, stating that Bella's dismay at being ordinary "will strike a chord even among girls who have no desire to be immortal, and like the vampires who watch Bella bleed with "fevered eyes," teens will relish this new adventure and hunger for more". Furthermore, Norah Piehl of Teenreads.com  thought that in the middle "the story sometimes drags, and readers may long for the vampires' return", though she believed that "New Moon will leave Meyer's many fans breathless for the sequel, as Bella finally understands everything that will be at stake if she makes the ultimate choice to give up her humanity and live, like the vampires, forever." Anna Limber of About.com echoed Piehl, saying that "the middle section is a little slow" and some aspects of the story were "predictable". However, she gave the book 3.5 stars out of 5 and said that the novel as a whole "has a brooding and melancholy feel to it, capturing well the angst of its teenage characters."

New Moon won the Senior Young Reader's Choice Award in 2009.

Adaptations

A film adaptation of New Moon was released on November 20, 2009. It is the sequel to 2008's Twilight, which is based on the previous novel written by Meyer. The film starred Kristen Stewart, Robert Pattinson, and Taylor Lautner, reprising their roles as Bella Swan, Edward Cullen, and Jacob Black, respectively. In late November 2008, Summit Entertainment greenlit the sequel, which was directed by Chris Weitz with Melissa Rosenberg returning as the screenwriter. The majority of the film was shot in Vancouver, British Columbia.

References

External links

 Stephenie Meyer's official New Moon website
 The Twilight Series' official website

2006 American novels
American fantasy novels
American romance novels
American vampire novels
Twilight (novel series)
Werewolf novels
2006 fantasy novels
American novels adapted into films